Nuevo Tocumen is a Panama Metro station on Line 2. It was opened on 25 April 2019 as the eastern terminus of the inaugural section of Line 2 between San Miguelito and Nuevo Tocumen. This is an elevated station built above the Pan-American Highway. The adjacent station is 24 de Diciembre.

References

Panama Metro stations
2019 establishments in Panama
Railway stations opened in 2019